The franga  is an obsolete unit of currency, equal to 5 lek, used in the Albanian Republic and Albanian Kingdom under Zogu. Coins denominated in Franga were in use from 1926 until 1939.

Coins
Between 1926 and 1938, 1, 2, and 5 franga coins were issued in silver (.835 fine for the two lower values, 900 fine for the five-franga coins), while 10, 20, 50, and 100 franga pieces were minted in gold (.900 fine).

Fractional pieces in denominated in lek and qindarka were also issued during the period.

Banknotes
An undated series of banknotes was issued by the National Bank of Albania in 1926. It comprised 1, 5, 20, and 100 franga notes, the first of which was recalled shortly after being released into circulation.

In 1939, during the Italian occupation, the 100 franga notes were overprinted to obscure the image of King Zog I.

Gallery

See also

Korçë frange

References

External links
 www.taxfreegold.co.uk about Franga
 Franga Banknote

 
Modern obsolete currencies